Murwillumbah was an electoral district of the Legislative Assembly in the Australian state of New South Wales from 1988 to 1999, which included the town of Murwillumbah.

Murwillumbah replaced Byron and its only member was Donald Frederick Beck, a member of the National Party. Murwillumbah was replaced by Tweed.

Members for Murwillumbah

Election results

References

Former electoral districts of New South Wales
Constituencies established in 1988
1988 establishments in Australia
Constituencies disestablished in 1999
1999 disestablishments in Australia